Wetworld is a BBC Books original novel written by Mark Michalowski and based on the long-running science fiction television series Doctor Who. It features the Tenth Doctor and Martha Jones.

Synopsis
When the TARDIS makes a disastrous landing in the swamps of the planet Sunday, the Doctor has no choice but to abandon Martha and try to find help. But the tranquillity of the swamps is deceptive, and even the TARDIS can't protect Martha forever.

Audiobook
An abridged audiobook was released in March 2008. It is read by Freema Agyeman, who plays Martha Jones.

See also
Whoniverse

References

External links

The Cloister Library - Wetworld

2007 British novels
2007 science fiction novels
New Series Adventures
Tenth Doctor novels
Novels by Mark Michalowski
Novels set on fictional planets